The First Merkel cabinet (German: Kabinett Merkel I) was the Government of the Federal Republic of Germany from 22 November 2005 to 27 October 2009 throughout the 16th legislative session of the Bundestag. Led by Christian Democrat Angela Merkel, the first female Chancellor in German history, the cabinet was supported by a grand coalition between the Christian Democratic Union (CDU), Christian Social Union of Bavaria (CSU) and the Social Democratic Party (SPD).

It was installed following the 2005 federal election and succeeded the second Schröder cabinet. It ceased to function after the formation of second Merkel cabinet, which was installed after the 2009 federal elections and sworn in on 28 October 2009.

Composition
The federal cabinet consisted of the following ministers:

|}

Formation of the grand coalition
Neither the coalitions of the CDU/CSU and the Free Democratic Party (FDP) nor the ruling SPD and Alliance '90/The Greens had the vote of a majority of members of the Bundestag following the 2005 federal election, so the CDU/CSU and SPD decided to form the second grand coalition in the history of the federal republic. Both CDU/CSU and SPD achieved a similar percentage of votes at the election (35.2% and 34.2%, respectively), so they decided that each would receive eight cabinet seats (with six for the CDU and two for the CSU). On 13 October the SPD announced their future ministers and on 17 October the CDU/CSU announced theirs.

Edmund Stoiber of the CSU was to become the Federal Minister of Economics and Technology, but refused the post on 1 November after a conflict with Angela Merkel over the abilities of the minister to succeed him, and chose to continue his state-level role in Bavaria.

The coalition agreement (Koalitionsvertrag), titled Together for Germany. With courage and humanity, was signed and accepted by the congress of the CDU, CSU, and SPD on 12, 13, and 14 November. Angela Merkel was elected Chancellor of Germany on 22 November 2005 by 397 votes to 202. From that date the cabinet was officially in power.

See also
Cabinet of Germany

References

External links
Official English names of German ministers and ministries (German Foreign Office)
  , the agreement of the coalition of 12 November 2005 between the CDU, CSU and SPD.
  , from the SPD official website.

Merkel I
Merkel I
2005 establishments in Germany
2009 disestablishments in Germany
Cabinets established in 2005
Cabinets disestablished in 2009
Angela Merkel
Grand coalition governments